Greenland Lake is a small, intermittent lake of northern Arizona, located at the north neck of the Walhalla Plateau (east Kaibab Plateau), in the northeast Grand Canyon. The lake is located just west (~1/8 mile), of the south-running Cape Royal Road (about 1.5 miles north of Vista Encantada), which eventually turns south-southwesterly to Cape Royal, about 15 miles distant. Greenland Lake is also about 1 mile east of Greenland Spring, at the far north of Bright Angel Canyon. Greenland Lake is often intermittent, depending on winter snowfall; the lake is surrounded mostly by aspen, but also Ponderosa Pine, and Douglas Fir. It is a common water source for wildlife, especially deer. In historic times, cattle were grazed in the area, and a wood cabin (high-pitched roof for snow), was used for storage of salt, for cattle.

References

External links

"The ever changing Greenland Lake–North Rim Grand Canyon" at Geogypsy

Grand Canyon
Grand Canyon National Park
Grand Canyon, Walhalla Plateau
Kaibab National Forest
Lakes of Arizona
Lakes of Coconino County, Arizona